This is the results breakdown of the local elections held in the Canary Islands on 10 June 1987. The following tables show detailed results in the autonomous community's most populous municipalities, sorted alphabetically.

Overall

City control
The following table lists party control in the most populous municipalities, including provincial capitals (shown in bold). Gains for a party are displayed with the cell's background shaded in that party's colour.

Municipalities

Arona
Population: 19,124

La Laguna
Population: 107,593

Las Palmas de Gran Canaria
Population: 356,911

Santa Cruz de Tenerife
Population: 211,209

Telde
Population: 73,913

Island Cabildos

See also
1987 Canarian regional election

References

Canary Islands
1987